1901 in sports describes the year's events in world sport.

American football
Professional championships
 Western Pennsylvania Championship – Homestead Library & Athletic Club

Association football
England
 The Football League – Liverpool 45 points, Sunderland 43, Notts County 40, Nottingham Forest 39, Bury 39, Newcastle United 38
 FA Cup final – Tottenham Hotspur 3–1 Sheffield United at Crystal Palace, London (replay following 2–2 draw at Crystal Palace).
 Tottenham Hotspur is the first (and to date only) non-League club to win the FA Cup since the foundation of the Football League.
 Brighton & Hove Albion FC founded.
Hungary
 Formation of the Hungarian Football Federation (i.e., the Magyar Labdarúgó Szövetség or MLSZ)
Peru
 Alianza Lima, officially founded on February 15.
Scotland
 Scottish Football League – Rangers
 Scottish Cup final – Hearts 4–3 Celtic at Ibrox Park

Athletics
 Jack Caffery wins the fifth running of the Boston Marathon.

Australian rules football
VFL Premiership
 Essendon wins the 5th VFL Premiership – Essendon 6.7 (43) d Collingwood 2.4 (16) at Lake Oval

Baseball
National championship
 National League championship – Pittsburgh Pirates
 American League championship – Chicago White Sox
Events
 The American League repudiates its minor status and competes with the National League as a second major league. The AL abandons four western cities for Washington, Baltimore, Philadelphia and Boston.  It signs about 30 prominent NL players before the season begins.
 The National League violates its constitution in the summer and there will be no major-minor agreement until the 1903 season.
 December – numerous minor leagues establish their own National Association of Professional Baseball Leagues, commonly called Minor League Baseball (1902 to date).

Boxing
Events
 Barbados Joe Walcott wins the World Welterweight Championship.  He is ranked by Nat Fleischer and Charley Rose as the #1 All-Time Welterweight; other sports personalities such as Tad Dorgan, Tom O'Rourke, Dan Morgan and Jimmy Johnston call him "the greatest pound for pound fighter who ever lived".
 Young Corbett II wins the World Featherweight Championship, defeating "Terrible" Terry McGovern with a second-round knockout
 The vacant World Bantamweight Championship is claimed first by Harry Harris, who fails to defend it and increases his weight, so making himself ineligible.  The title is then awarded to Harry Forbes following his second-round knockout of Danny Dougherty
Lineal world champions
 World Heavyweight Championship – James J. Jeffries
 World Middleweight Championship – Tommy Ryan
 World Welterweight Championship – William "Matty" Matthews → James "Rube" Ferns → Barbados Joe Walcott
 World Lightweight Championship – Frank Erne
 World Featherweight Championship – "Terrible" Terry McGovern → Young Corbett II
 World Bantamweight Championship – title vacant → Harry Harris → title vacant → Harry Forbes

Cricket
Events
 No cricket is played in South Africa due to the Boer War.
England
 County Championship – Yorkshire
 Minor Counties Championship – Durham
 Most runs – Bobby Abel 3309 @ 55.15 (HS 247)
 Most wickets – Wilfred Rhodes 251 @ 15.12 (BB 8–53)
 Wisden Cricketers of the Year – Len Braund, Charlie McGahey, Frank Mitchell, Willie Quaife, Johnny Tyldesley
Australia
 Sheffield Shield – Victoria
 Most runs – Clem Hill 620 @ 103.33 (HS 365*)
 Most wickets – Jack Saunders 29 @ 17.13 (BB 6–70) and Joe Travers 29 @ 20.75 (BB 9–30)
India
 Bombay Presidency – Parsees
South Africa
 Currie Cup – not contested
West Indies
 Inter-Colonial Tournament – Trinidad and Tobago

Figure skating
World Figure Skating Championships
 World Men's Champion – Ulrich Salchow (Sweden)

Golf
Major tournaments
 British Open – James Braid
 US Open – Willie Anderson
Other tournaments
 British Amateur – Harold Hilton
 US Amateur – Walter Travis

Horse racing
England
 Grand National – Grudon
 1,000 Guineas Stakes – Aida
 2,000 Guineas Stakes – Handicapper
 The Derby – Volodyovski
 The Oaks – Cap and Bells II
 St. Leger Stakes – Doricles
Australia
 Melbourne Cup – Revenue
Canada
 King's Plate – John Ruskin
Ireland
 Irish Grand National – Tipperary Boy
 Irish Derby Stakes – Carrigavalla
USA
 Kentucky Derby – His Eminence
 Preakness Stakes – The Parader
 Belmont Stakes – Commando

Ice hockey
Stanley Cup
 Winnipeg Victorias defeats defending champion Montreal Shamrocks in a Cup challenge, two games to nil
 Winnipeg Victorias wins the Manitoba Hockey Association (MHA) title over the Winnipeg Hockey Club and successfully defends the Stanley Cup title
 Ottawa Hockey Club wins the Canadian Amateur Hockey League (CAHL) championship but declines to challenge Winnipeg for the Stanley Cup

Lacrosse
Events
 Sir Donald Mann donates the Mann Cup.  
 Lord Minto, the Governor General of Canada, donates the Minto Cup.
 Ottawa Capitals win the first Mann Cup and the first Minto Cup.

Motor racing
Paris–Berlin Trail
 The Paris–Berlin Trail is run on 27–29 June over 1105 km and won by Henri Fournier (France) driving a Mors in a time of 15:33:06.  The race is in retrospect sometimes referred to as the VI Grand Prix de l'ACF.
Paris–Bordeaux Trail
 The Paris–Bordeaux Trail is run on 29 May over 527.1 km and won by Henri Fournier (France) driving a Mors in a time of 6:10:44.  The race incorporates the Gordon Bennett Cup (see below).
Gordon Bennett Cup
 The second Gordon Bennett Cup is run from Paris to Bordeaux in conjunction with the Paris–Bordeaux Trail (see above) and won by Léonce Girardot (France) driving a Panhard-Levassor.
Circuit du Sud-Ouest
 The Circuit du Sud-Ouest was run in Pau. Some anglophone sources wrongly call it the 'Pau Grand Prix'. This may stem from a mistranslation of the contemporary French sources such as the magazine La France Auto of March 1901.  It was run in four classes around the streets of Pau. The Grand Prix du Palais d’Hiver was the name of the prizes awarded for the lesser classes ('Light cars' and 'Voiturettes'). The Grand Prix de Pau was the name of the prize awarded for the 'Heavy' (fastest) class. Thus Maurice Farman was awarded the 'Grand Prix de Pau' for his overall victory in the Circuit du Sud-Ouest driving a Panhard 24 hp. Additionally the Grand Prix du Palais d’Hiver (400 à 650 kg 'Light car' class) was awarded to Henri Farman (Darracq); the second Grand Prix du Palais d’Hiver for the under 400 kg Voiturettesclass was awarded to Louis Renault (Renault); the Prix du Béarn was awarded to Osmont in a 'De Dion' tricycle.

Rowing
The Boat Race
 30 March — Oxford wins the 58th Oxford and Cambridge Boat Race

Rugby league
England
 Championship – not contested
 Challenge Cup final – Batley 6–0 Warrington at Headingley Rugby Stadium, Leeds
 Lancashire League Championship – Oldham
 Yorkshire League Championship – Bradford F.C.

Rugby union
Home Nations Championship
 19th Home Nations Championship series is won by Scotland

Speed skating
Speed Skating World Championships
 Men's All-round Champion – Franz Frederik Wathén (Finland)

Tennis
England
 Wimbledon Men's Singles Championship – Arthur Gore (GB) defeats Reginald Doherty (GB) 4–6 7–5 6–4 6–4
 Wimbledon Women's Singles Championship – Charlotte Cooper Sterry (GB) defeats Blanche Bingley Hillyard (GB) 6–2 6–2
France
 French Men's Singles Championship – André Vacherot (France) defeats Paul Lebreton (France): details unknown
 French Women's Singles Championship – P. Girod (France) defeats Leroux (France) (scores unknown)
USA
 American Men's Singles Championship – William Larned (USA) defeats Beals Wright (USA) 6–2 6–8 6–4 6–4
 American Women's Singles Championship – Elisabeth Moore (USA) defeats Myrtle McAteer (USA) 6–4 3–6 7–5 2–6 6–2
Davis Cup
 1901 International Lawn Tennis Challenge –  walkover

Yacht racing
America's Cup
 The New York Yacht Club retains the America's Cup as Columbia defeats British challenger Shamrock II, of the Royal Ulster Yacht Club, 3 races to 0

References

 
Sports by year